Kalindula is a kind of bass guitar which gives its name to a style of popular music in southern-central Africa. It originated in the late 20th century and is popular in Zambia and is also found in Malawi and Zimbabwe. Some people claim it originated in the Democratic Republic of Congo but this cannot be fully supported by the evidence.  It combines features of 20th century popular music with rhythmic and metric elements.

The kalindula musical style is characterized by an up-tempo rhythm and, in addition to the kalindula bass guitar, one or more hand-crafted guitars which are called 'banjos' (pronounced locally as 'bahn-jo').  Homemade drum sets are also used in some kalindula bands.  Kalindula bands in urban areas often incorporate electric guitars, electric bass and modern drum sets into their ensembles.

In the Southern Province of Zambia, kalindula bands compete to participate in the annual Tonga Music Festival sponsored by Chikuni Radio station.  Winning groups are offered recording contracts by the radio station and their tapes are sold in markets throughout the province.  Current favorites in the Southern Province are Green Mamba and Mashombe Blue Jeans. Amayenge, winners of the 2005 Ngoma Music Award, are another well-known and long-established group, together with Distro Kuomboka band, winners of several regional and national awards as 'Best Band', who dominate the Kalindula scene on the Copperbelt.

See also
 List of African musicians

External links
 Chikuni Radio
 Tonga Music Festival photo gallery 
 Kalindula Music Videos

Other information

Zambian musical instruments
Malawian music
Zimbabwean musical instruments
Bass guitars